Auto carrier or car carrier or car transporter or auto transporter can refer to:

Transportation
 An autorack (a railroad car), called a car transporter in UK English. 
 A car carrier trailer, in other words a semi-trailer especially designed to carry automobiles, vans, or pickup trucks.
 A roll-on/roll-off ship that transports new cars.
 Auto Carriers Ltd UK car maker from 1911 to 1922, thereafter A.C. Cars Ltd.

Biology
 Autotransporter protein (see Type V secretion system, T5SS)
 Autotransporter domain